Postgraduate training in education may refer to:

 Postgraduate Certificate in Education (United Kingdom)
 Postgraduate Diploma in Education
 Postgraduate education 
 Postgraduate diploma
 School of education
 Teacher education